Lau Wan-kit (born on July 19, 1966), also known as Jeffrey Lau, is a comic artist from Hong Kong.

Lau joined the comics business field as a comics assistant in 1985, and became an artist in 1988 with his first work "Anti-ROCK" in Comics For City People. In 1991, he had his first Collection Interlude, and became the symbol of local love comics. Feel 100% of 1992 was a great success and changed his comics business. It has been adapted into movies and online drama many times.

Happy Tennis was released in 2007 from The One Comics Publishing LTD.

His work Feel 100% won the International Manga Award that Japanese government sponsored in 2008.

Works
Anti-ROCK (1988)
Interlude (1991)
Feel 100% (1992–2007)
Happy Tennis (2007-)

External links
 The One Comics blog

Hong Kong comics artists
1966 births
Living people